The  was a gyrodyne (compound autogyro) designed by Shiro Kayaba and prototyped by Kayaba Industry in Japan during the early 1950s.

Design and development

In March 1952, Kayaba Industry began the development of the Heliplane, a Gyrodyne, which combines the advantages of autogyro and helicopter. Kayaba took advantage of experience producing the Ka-Go Ka-1 and Ka-2 autogyros, intended for reconnaissance, artillery-spotting and anti-submarine use, developed during World War II.

Kayaba received a subsidy of 2 million yen from the government of Japan for the development of the aircraft, as well as 1.2 million yen from Ishikawajima Heavy Industries (IHI) for development of the rotor-tip ramjets. The aircraft was modified from Cessna 170B. The wing was removed, and a three-blade main rotor with support structure was installed on the upper part of the fuselage. In addition, short-span fixed wings were fitted to either side of the lower fuselage. For initial testing the fixed pitch wooden propeller of the Cessna 170 was retained, but a 3-bladed variable-pitch propeller was to be fitted for flight testing. Ishikawajima had developed the Ne-0 ramjet during the war and tested it in flight beneath a Kawasaki Ki-48-II. A development of this ramjet was envisaged as the power source for the rotor drive. At takeoff, the rotor was to be started using the tip mounted ramjet engines, then transition to an autogyro powered by the propeller engine after the ramjets were stopped.

One prototype unit was produced and almost completed in March 1954 (Showa 29), but was damaged in July 1954 during tie-down testing. Further development was cancelled before the aircraft was flown.

Specifications (Heliplane)

References

External links

 <Chronological record> Helicopter half-century in Japan (1945-50s) - Japan Helicopter Technology Association official website. Viewed on December 5, 2002, Retrieved February 10, 2017.
 Attempt at the dawn of the helicopter in our Japan Aviation Now / Modern aeronautics (rewritten draft of the 37th Airplane Symposium hosted by the Japan Aviation Space Association). 1999, November 26, 2015. Retrieved February 10 2017.
birthplace collection / The birthplace of the jet engine in Japan.　 Retrieved February 11 2017.
Gas turbine gallery _ Public benefit organization The Japan Gas Turbine Society. Retrieved February 11 2017.

Kayaba aircraft
1950s Japanese civil utility aircraft
Tipjet-powered helicopters
Compound helicopters
Gyrodynes
Single-engined tractor autogyros
Rotorcraft
VTOL aircraft